Ludu Daw Amar (also Ludu Daw Ah Mar; , ; 29 November 1915 – 7 April 2008) was a well known and respected leading dissident writer and journalist in Mandalay, Burma. She was married to fellow writer and journalist Ludu U Hla  and was the mother of popular writer Nyi Pu Lay. She is best known for her outspoken anti-government views and radical left wing journalism besides her outstanding work on traditional Burmese arts, theatre, dance and music, and several works of translation from English, both fiction and non-fiction.

Student writer and activist
Born into an old established Mandalay family that traded in tobacco and manufactured cheroots, Amar was the fourth in a family of twelve, of whom only six survived to adulthood. She was educated at the American Baptist Mission School and subsequently the National High School under the headmaster Abdul Razak who later became the Education Minister in Aung San's cabinet and was assassinated with him and others in July 1947. She read science at the Mandalay Intermediate College and went on to Rangoon University for a bachelor's degree. Her first notable work was a translation of Trials in Burma by Maurice Collis in 1938, and by that time she was already published in the university's Owei (Peacock's Call) magazine, and also Kyipwa Yay (Progress) magazine, run by her future husband U Hla, under her own name as well as the pen names Mya Myint Zu and Khin La Win.

When the second university students strike in history broke out in 1936, Amar and her friend from Mandalay M.A. Ma Ohn became famous as women student leaders among the strikers camped out on the terraces of the Shwedagon Pagoda. U Hla was a staunch supporter of the strike and started courting Amar; in 1939 they got married and U Hla moved his magazine to Mandalay.

Wartime Kyipwa Yay
The family fled to the countryside north of Mandalay when the Second World War broke out in the East in 1942, but the magazine continued to come out. Daw Amar translated one of the three wartime bestsellers of the Japanese soldier writer Hino Ashihei called Wheat and Soldiers and published it together with the other two translated by her husband. She also translated The Rainbow (Thettant yaung) by the Czechoslovak writer Wanda Wasilewska in 1945, printed on blue matchbox wrapping paper, the only kind of paper available at the time. Both husband and wife became involved in the Resistance movement against the Japanese Occupation, and formed the Asha Lu Nge (Asia Youth) organisation in Mandalay. Her husband was arrested briefly by the military authorities after the recapture of the city by the British Fourteenth Army on account of the Hino Ashihei books.

Postwar Ludu
At the end of the war in 1945 U Hla launched a fortnightly paper called the Ludu Journal - Ludu is Burmese for 'the people/masses' - with Amar as his assistant editor. The Ludu Daily was successfully launched the following year and the couple subsequently came to be known as Ludu U Hla and Ludu Daw Amar. Their incisive political commentaries and analyses made a significant contribution to the country's yearning for independence and unified struggle against colonial rule. Their publications had never carried advertisements for alcohol, drugs to enhance sexual performance or gambling, nor racing tips, salacious affairs and gossip. U Hla had to be persuaded to make an exception of film advertisements for the survival of the paper.
 
One morning in 1948, soon after Burma gained her independence from Britain, however, the Kyipwa Yay Press in Mandalay was dynamited to rubble by government troops who were angry that the Ludu couple appeared to be sympathetic to the Communists. This was a time when regime change happened quite often with the city falling into the hands, in turn, of the Karen rebels, Communists and the new Socialist government under U Nu. The entire family, including two pregnant women, was thrown out into the street, lined up and was about to be gunned down when a number of monks and locals successfully intervened to save their lives.

In 1953 Amar travelled abroad to the World Democratic Women's Conference in Copenhagen, World Peace Conference in Budapest, and 4th World Festival of Youth and Students in Bucharest. In October 1953 the Anti-Fascist People's Freedom League (AFPFL) government of U Nu imprisoned U Hla under Section 5 for sedition as a political prisoner after publishing a controversial news story in the paper and he spent over three years in Rangoon's Central Jail until his release in January 1957. They had five children by now, with the youngest Nyein Chan ( his given name means 'peace' in Burmese, pseudonym Nyi Pu Lay b. 1952) barely a toddler. In March 1959 the paper was sealed off by the authorities, and it did not come out again until May the next year. Amar travelled to Moscow in 1962 as an invited guest by Aeroflot Russian Airlines and visited East Germany, Czechoslovakia and China. U Hla and Daw Amar were well known to foreign students of Burmese as well as Burmese writers, journalists and artists; the younger generation of budding writers and artists called them 'U-Lay' (Uncle) and 'Daw Daw' (Aunty). Their home, Ludu Taik (Ludu House) on 84th. and 33rd, and always open to such visitors, was often their first port of call in Mandalay.

Military era

The Ludu Daily was closed down by the military government on July 7, 1967. The paper had openly championed for peace and a socialist society, and came out very strongly in support of the peace parley in 1963 between the Revolutionary Council government of Ne Win and various insurgent groups, both Communist and ethnic, just as they had done before in the early years of the civil war in the 1950s. When the peace talks broke down, Amar's oldest son Soe Win (b. 1941), aged 22 and a student leader at Rangoon University, went underground with a few others to join the Communist Party of Burma. He was killed in a bloody purge in 1967 in the jungles of Bago Yoma mountains when the CPB carried out its own cultural revolution. The Ludu couple, true to Burmese Buddhist attitude to death, declined an invitation from the authorities to visit their first born's jungle grave. Their second son Po Than Gyaung (b. 1945) was also arrested for alleged clandestine student political activities at Mandalay University in July 1966, aged 21, and detained without charge or trial until May 1972. He spent part of his imprisonment in Mandalay Prison and later on Cocos Island Penal Colony in the Andaman Sea.

They were personally known to Ne Win from the early days, and the latter often called at their place whenever he visited Mandalay. They carried on with writing, researching, organising literary seminars, giving talks and publishing material other than domestic politics, and remained active in social and community affairs. In 1975 they accepted the government's invitation to give talks to university students from both Mandalay and Rangoon taking part in the reconstruction of the temples in Bagan damaged by the great earthquake of the same year. Amar was given the epithet 'tough by name, tough by nature' by some people (amar means 'tough/hardy' in Burmese).

Publications
Daw Amar had written several books including biographies, travelogues, treatises on traditional Burmese culture, and numerous articles in various magazines, some of them autobiographical and many collected into books later.
  - President Ho Chi Minh  1950
  - To the Socialist Lands 1963
  - Artistes that People Loved 1964; it won the national award for Literature on Burmese Culture and Arts in the same year.
 , Po Sein, Sein Gadoun - Theatre performers of the same names 1967
  - Artists of the same names in 2 volumes 1969
  - Theatre performer of the same name 1970
  - Traditional open air performance in 2 volumes 1973
  - The World's Biggest Book 1973, English translation by Dr. Than Tun 1974
 Shwedaungtaung Articles 1975, translated into Japanese by Yasuko Dobashi aka Yin Yin Mya 1994
 Sayagyi Thakin Kodaw Hmaing - a biography of Thakin Kodaw Hmaing 1976
  - From the Chindwin to the Sea: a travelogue 1985
  - Burma's Classical Music 1989
  - Tobacco and Man, co-authored with U Hla (Daw Amar smoked from 8 years of age till her 40s)
  - Mandalayans 1991
  - Mandalay, Our Mandalay 1993
  - The Royal Teachers (Buddhist Abbots): the Light of Sasana 1994
  - When We Were Young 1994
  - From Taung Layloun to Natkyun: Words to Remember
  - The World's Biggest Stone Image 1996
  - Modern Burmese Art 1997
  - Mother's Words of Old  in 2 volumes 1997, vol 3 2007
  - Eighty Three Years Eighty Three Words 1998
  - Windows on South Asia 1990
  - My Husband My Young Love 2001
  - The Twelve-Season Festival Traders and Our Upcountry 2002
  - Nostalgia 2003
  - Customers in a Bookstore: Musings 2004] 
  Short Stories 2006
Translated works from English include:
 Trials in Burma  by Maurice Collis  in 2 volumes 1938
 Sandamala  by Maurice Collis 1940
 Wheat and Soldiers  by Hino Ashihei 1945
 The Rainbow  by Wanda Wasilewska 1945
 The Challenge of Red China  by Gunther Stein in 2 volumes 1949
 In the Name of Peace  by Archie John Stone 1953
 Listen Yankees  by C. Wright Mills 1963
 Cash and Violence in Laos  by Anna Lewis Strong 1963
 The Other Side of the River  by Edgar Snow 1966
 Memoirs of China in Revolution  by Chester Ronning 1979
 African Short Stories 1989
 Thai Short Stories in 2 volumes 1992 - 1993

Magazine articles:
  - My Profile on the Life of Ludu U Hla in Shwe Amyutei

Famous dissident

Daw Amar had been very outspoken against the military regime particularly in her later years. She was arrested together with her husband and their youngest son Nyein Chan in 1978, after her second son Po Than Gyaung went underground to join the Communist Party of Burma (current spokesman for the CPB) just like his late brother Soe Win before him in 1963. Daw Amar and Nyein Chan were not released for more than a year from prison until later in 1979 after U Hla  had been released. Nyein Chan was re-arrested in December 1989 this time to spend nearly 10 years in prison. Po Than Gyaung, now living in exile in Yunnan, would never see his mother again.

U Hla died in 1982 after 43 years of marriage, five children and six grandchildren. The Ludu couple had been one of the best known husband-and-wife teams among the Burmese literati. Daw Amar suffered another loss when her printing plants and warehouses burnt down in the great fire of 1984 that wiped out the heart of Mandalay. Since she turned 70 in 1985, Daw Amar's birthday had been celebrated by the world of art and literature in Burma every year. The event had become an unofficial convention of dissidents under the watchful eyes of the ever-present Military Intelligence Service, normally taking place at Taung Laylone Monastery by the shores of Taungthaman Lake in Amarapura near Mandalay until November 2006 when the venue had to be changed under pressure from the authorities. She remained active in public life and was instrumental in founding the Byamazo Luhmuyay Athin (Mutual Voluntary Aid Association) in 1998 engaged in helping poor families with the cost of healthcare and funeral arrangements. She had been called 'Mother of the People' and 'Grand Old Lady'. In a society where old age is revered,  most people would address her as Amei (Mother) the same as she would refer to herself according to Burmese custom.

"For those of us who don't dance to the tune of the authorities, we must be creative in what we write to get our message across" she said confirming that there was no freedom of press in Burma.
She regretted that she had to give up journalism, and could only write about tradition and culture. In her articles collected later into "Mother's Words of Old", she bemoaned the loosening of social cohesion, morals, and traditional values in dress and manner which she blamed on economic disorder, consumerism and globalisation, and Chinese immigration. She once wrote that the Chinese had occupied Mandalay without firing a shot, and had dubbed the present Lawpan  (boss in Chinese) era; she felt as if Mandalay was an undeclared colony of Yunnan Province. Daw Amar was a staunch defender of Burmese history, culture, religion and sovereignty embodied in her birthplace, the last royal capital of Burma, Mandalay - thus broadly nationalistic, religious and ethnocentric traditionalist in her perspective, and yet she had been in the forefront of modernising the written language, fostering mutual understanding and friendship between the dominant Bamar and the ethnic minorities in tandem with her husband, promoting sex education and public awareness of the HIV/AIDS problem, and voicing complaints regarding unpaid labour contributions of women in society.

Ludu Daw Amar died on 7 April 2008 at the age of 92. Her home was Ludu Taik in Mandalay with her second daughter Tin Win (b. 1947) in charge of the publishing business and her youngest son Nyein Chan (writer Nyi Pu Lay - b. 1952) and his family. Her oldest daughter Than Yin Mar (b. 1943), a retired professor of medicine who has also started writing assuming one of her mother's old pen names Mya Myint Zu, looked after her health. She was survived by her two sons, two daughters and six grandchildren.

See also
Ludu U Hla

References

External links
Adorable Mother's Admirable Journey Poem by Tin Moe on Ludu Daw Amar's 80th birthday, translated by Than Tun
Ludu Daw Amar Kyaw Min Htun
Interview with Ludu Daw Amar Radio Free Asia (Burmese), November 29, 2005
Security Fears Prompt Writer's Birthday Party Cancellation The Irrawaddy, November 28, 2006
Intelligence agents and paramilitaries monitor writer's 91st birthday celebration Reporters sans frontières, November 30, 2006
Writer Ludu Daw Amar's Birthday Celebrated in Mandalay Saw Yan Naing, The Irrawaddy, November 29, 2007
"Half a Century of Publishing in Mandalay" by Anna Allott (PDF full article) Center for Burma Studies, Northern Illinois University, USA
Ludu Daw Amar - Obituary by Anna Allott The Guardian, April 12, 2008
 Nyi Pu Lay  The Kenyon Review, summer/fall 2002
Articles in Burmese by Comrade Po Than Gyaung Nguyinpyin.net

1915 births
2008 deaths
Humanitarians
Burmese journalists
People from Mandalay
University of Yangon alumni
Burmese women journalists
Translators from English
20th-century translators
20th-century Burmese women writers
21st-century Burmese women writers
20th-century Burmese writers
21st-century Burmese writers
20th-century journalists